Toussaint Rabenala (born 29 October 1965) is a retired Malagasy triple jumper.

International competition

1Representing Africa

Personal bests
Long jump - 7.77 metres (1990) - national record.
Triple jump - 17.05 metres (1989) - national record.

References

External links

1965 births
Living people
Malagasy male triple jumpers
Athletes (track and field) at the 1992 Summer Olympics
Olympic athletes of Madagascar
African Games bronze medalists for Madagascar
African Games medalists in athletics (track and field)
Athletes (track and field) at the 1987 All-Africa Games
Athletes (track and field) at the 1999 All-Africa Games
Competitors at the 1986 Goodwill Games